Erechthias dracaenura is a moth of the family Tineidae. It is endemic to São Tomé Island, an island off the western equatorial coast of Central Africa. The species was described by Edward Meyrick in 1934.

The length of the forewings is about 8 mm. The forewings have a whitish background colour, irrorated (speckled) with isolated brown scales and marked with 6–8 scattered, moderately large, darker brown to black spots.

References

Moths described in 1934
Erechthiinae
Endemic fauna of São Tomé Island
Insects of São Tomé and Príncipe
Moths of Africa